Karitas Karisimbi (born 26 May 1974) is a Ugandan radio host, television presenter and producer of reality TV shows. She is currently working with the Next Media Services.

Karisimbi did a journalism course in Nairobi and an information technology course in the United Kingdom.

She once worked at WBS TV hosting the show called Time Magazine.

References 

Living people
1974 births
Ugandan Africanists
Ugandan television presenters
Ugandan women business executives
Ugandan business executives